Simpi Linganna (1905 – 5 May 1993), was a writer of the Kannada language. He is known for his immense contribution for folk literature. He was the President of 62nd Kannada Sahitya Sammelana which was held at Koppal in 1992.

Life and career
Simpi Linganna was born in 1905 in the village of Chadchan in Bijapur district of Karnataka. He basically worked as a primary school teacher and took up writing as a hobby.

Literary contributions
Swargadoolegalu
Garathiya Baalu
Janangada Jeevala
Naatya Sadhane
Mugilujenu

Awards and recognitions
Simpi Liganna's many awards and recognitions include:
 President Award as a Teacher
 Karnataka Sahitya Akademi Award for Poetry (1968): Shruthaashrutha
 Honorary Doctor of Literature from Karnatak University
 Bombay Government Prize.
 Mysore Government Prize.
 President of 62nd Kannada Sahithya Sammelana, 1993, Koppal

External links
Works of Simpi Linganna available at www.chilume.com

Notes

1905 births
1993 deaths
People from Bijapur district, Karnataka
Kannada-language writers
Indian schoolteachers
Educators from Karnataka
Poets from Karnataka
20th-century Indian poets